Hieracium villosum, the shaggy hawkweed, is a species of flowering plant in the family Asteraceae.

Description
The many-stellate flowers are bright yellow,  large, on white-hairy stems. They bloom from July to August.

Distribution
This species is native to France, Italy, Central Europe, the Balkan Peninsula, Romania and Russia.

Habitat

References
Christoper Brickell (Editor-in-chief): RHS A-Z Encyclopedia of Garden Plants. Third edition. Dorling Kindersley, London 2003
Biolib

External links
Alpine Plat Encyclopaedia
Hortipedia
Luirig.altervista

villosum